Nataliya Vorobyova (born 15 November 1972) is a Kazakhstani sprinter. She competed in the women's 100 metres at the 1996 Summer Olympics.

References

External links
 

1972 births
Living people
Athletes (track and field) at the 1996 Summer Olympics
Kazakhstani female sprinters
Olympic athletes of Kazakhstan
Place of birth missing (living people)
20th-century Kazakhstani women